This is a list of Canadian films which were released in 2001:

See also
 2001 in Canada
 2001 in Canadian television

External links
short&year=2001,2001 Feature Films Released In 2001 With Country of Origin Canada at IMDb
Canada's Top Ten for 2001 (list of top ten Canadian feature films, selected in a process administered by TIFF)

2001
2001 in Canadian cinema
Canada